Crassula tetramera is a herb in the family Crassulaceae.

It is found on upper slopes and summits in the Great Southern, Wheatbelt and Goldfields-Esperance regions of Western Australia where it grows in stony sandy-loam soils over quartzite or granite.

References

tetramera
Plants described in 1998
Flora of Western Australia
Saxifragales of Australia